Grand River Aseptic Manufacturing (GRAM) is a clinical and commercial sterile manufacturing contractor to the pharmaceutical industry. It has lyophilization, terminal sterilization, analytical, microbiological testing services.

History 
GRAM was founded in 2010 by Van Andel Institute and Grand Valley State University.

In 2017, Arlington Capital Partners, a private equity firm in Washington, D.C. took a majority ownership stake in GRAM.

In June 2020, GRAM finished a $60 million expansion to install a 61,500-square-foot fill-finish injectable facility on the same site to triple GRAM's manufacturing footprint to more than 100,000 square feet of production space.

In 2020, BARDA and Johnson & Johnson contracted with GRAM to do fill and finish services for vaccines in response to the coronavirus pandemic.

In 2022 GRAM was contracted by HHS to fill and finish 2.5 million of the 5.5 million vials of JYNNEOS monkeypox vaccine ordered by the Department of Health and Human Services.

COVID Vaccine facility 
In June 2020, GRAM finished a $60 million expansion to install another fill-finish injectables facility with the plan to market it to U.S. drugmakers. The 61,500-square-foot facility included in that expansion tripled GRAM's manufacturing footprint to more than 100,000 square feet of production space.

GRAM chose SKAN isolators, a Bausch+Ströbel filler and an IMA lyophilizer. The facility was qualified in July 2020.

In August 2020, BARDA awarded GRAM a one-year, $160 million contract to provide fill and finish services for vaccines in response to the coronavirus pandemic.

In September, GRAM agreed with Janssen Pharmaceuticals, one of the companies of Johnson & Johnson, to support the manufacture of its SARS-CoV-2 vaccine candidate, including technology transfer and fill and finish manufacture.

Awards 
In 2017, 2018, 2019, and 2020 Inc. Magazine ranked GRAM as one of the Inc. 5000 fastest-growing private companies in America. The company won West Michigan's Best and Brightest Companies to Work For in 2017 and 2020.

References  

Pharmaceutical companies of the United States
University spin-offs
Grand Rapids, Michigan